Sir Richard Kenneth Green  (3 December 1907 – 19 March 1961) was an Australian politician and judge.

He was born in Burnie, Tasmania. In 1946 he was elected to the Tasmanian Legislative Council as the independent member for Launceston, but he resigned in 1950 to take up a seat on the Tasmanian Supreme Court. Green was knighted in 1957 and died in Melbourne in 1961.

References

1907 births
1961 deaths
Independent members of the Parliament of Tasmania
Members of the Tasmanian Legislative Council
Judges of the Supreme Court of Tasmania
Australian Knights Commander of the Order of the British Empire
Australian politicians awarded knighthoods
20th-century Australian politicians